Fabián Jorge Manzano Pérez (born 13 January 1994), is a Chilean footballer who plays as midfielder for Deportes Puerto Montt.

Club career

Honours

Club
Universidad Católica
 Primera División de Chile (2): 2016 Clausura, 2016 Apertura
 Supercopa de Chile (1): 2016

Palestino
 Copa Chile (1): 2018

External links
 

1994 births
Living people
Footballers from Santiago
Chilean footballers
Chilean expatriate footballers
Club Deportivo Universidad Católica footballers
Club Deportivo Palestino footballers
Unión La Calera footballers
Racing Club de Montevideo players
Deportes Copiapó footballers
Puerto Montt footballers
Chilean Primera División players
Uruguayan Segunda División players
Primera B de Chile players
Chilean expatriate sportspeople in Uruguay
Expatriate footballers in Uruguay
Association football midfielders